Wesley Henrique Lima Silva e Silva (born 7 March 1985), commonly known as Pipico, is a Brazilian footballer who plays as a striker for Santa Cruz.

Pipico began his career as a youth player for Itaperuna, where he played for six months, before moving to Angra do Reis, America and Bahia, when Pipico started his professional career. After this, Pipico played for Floresta, Cabofriense, Bangu and Macaé, always having passages of great prominence, especially in Campeonato Carioca. In 2012, after one and a half year of interest and negotiations, Pipico made a move to Vasco da Gama to play Brazilian Série A, but wasn't very successful. He moved for first time to a foreign team, more precisely to play Major League Soccer for FC Dallas, but weeks later he returned to Brazil, signing with melhorAtlético Goianiense.

Career

Vasco da Gama

For a one and a half years, Vasco da Gama showed interest in having Pipico in their squad. However, Vasco da Gama's optimal phase team in 2011 season meant that negotiations were postponed. On 20 April 2012, Pipico rescinded his contract with Macaé, to sign a contract for 8 months with Vasco da Gama. On the next day (Brazilian holiday, Tiradentes Day), Pipico was presented discreetly, but with enough optimism, promising to "take this opportunity in the best way possible and helping Vasco da Gama making goals to win titles."

Pipico made his debut for Vasco da Gama on 8 July in a 1-1 draw against Figueirense, entering in the second half subbed Alecsandro. Their games were against in the days following 21 July against Santos, 19 August against Flamengo (Clássico dos Milhões), and 29 August against Grêmio, as always reserve (entering in place of Carlos Alberto, Éder Luís and Carlos Alberto again, respectively). On 1 September, in a 2-0 win over Portuguesa, Pipico receives his first red card of his career, after applying a possible dangerous sliding tackle in Gustavo.

FC Dallas
Pipico moved to the United States on December 18, 2012 when he signed for Major League Soccer club FC Dallas. Pipico was released by Dallas just 6-weeks later on February 1, 2013 during their pre-season camp.

Style of play

Pipico excelled at Fluminense football and is considered by the public as a complete forward. He is described as a quick striker with good technique, tactical commitment with good pace, jumping and heading, despite not being all that tall. Two months before signing for Vasco da Gama, players such as Juninho Pernambucano and Fellipe Bastos asked the striker about a transfer, saying that "it was time for (Pipico) goes to a big club." Journalists like Lédio Carmona and Raphael Rezende, from Globo and SporTV, already was describing Pipico as an "extremely interesting and intelligent forward, with amazing speed, extreme pace and handling, can appear either as a second striker, as a centre forward, making him an extremely dangerous player and deserving a special marking to stop him."

Career statistics

(Correct )

1Includes other competitive competitions, including the Campeonato Brasileiro Série C, Copa Rio (state cup) and Campeonato Carioca Série B.

Honours
Bangu
 Copa Rio (runner-up): 2010

Individual
Campeonato Carioca Série B Most Valuable Player: 2007
Campeonato Carioca Série B top scorer: 2007
Campeonato Carioca Série B Newcomer of the Year: 2007
Campeonato Carioca Newcomer of the Year: 2008
Copa Rio Most Valuable Player: 2010
Copa Rio top scorer: 2010
Campeonato Carioca Best Supporting Striker: 2011
Copa do Brasil top scorer:2019

References

External links
Pipico at playmakerstats.com (English version of ogol.com.br)
Vasco da Gama official profile

1985 births
Living people
Brazilian footballers
Brazilian expatriate footballers
Campeonato Brasileiro Série A players
Campeonato Brasileiro Série B players
America Football Club (RJ) players
Esporte Clube Bahia players
Associação Desportiva Cabofriense players
Bangu Atlético Clube players
Macaé Esporte Futebol Clube players
CR Vasco da Gama players
FC Dallas players
Atlético Clube Goianiense players
Esporte Clube XV de Novembro (Piracicaba) players
Red Bull Brasil players
Guarani FC players
Association football forwards
Sportspeople from Rio de Janeiro (state)
People from Itaperuna